Buen Retiro Itenez Airport  is an airstrip  northeast of Baures in the Beni Department of Bolivia.

Buen Retiro Itenez is on the San Joaquin River, a minor tributary of the San Martin River.

See also

Transport in Bolivia
List of airports in Bolivia

References

External links 
OpenStreetMap - Buen Retiro Itenez Airport
OurAirports - Buen Retiro Itenez Airport
Fallingrain - Buen Retiro Itenez Airport
HERE/Nokia Maps - Buen Retiro Itenez Airport

Airports in Beni Department